Thomas Reynolds (27 January 1818 – 25 February 1875) was the fifth Premier of South Australia, serving from 9 May 1860 to 8 October 1861.

Reynolds was born in England in 1818, and on leaving school had experience in the grocery business. He came to South Australia in 1840 as an early colonist at the invitation of his brother, who had a draper's shop at Adelaide. The brother had died by the time Thomas Reynolds arrived and he soon opened a grocer's shop, was successful for a time, but like many others fell into financial difficulties when the gold rush began.

Reynolds became an alderman in the Adelaide City Council in 1854, succeeding William Paxton, but a few months afterwards resigned to enter the unicameral South Australian Legislative Council. In 1857 he was elected for Sturt in the first South Australian House of Assembly, a seat he held until 12 March 1860. From September 1857 to June 1858 he was commissioner of public works in the Hanson ministry.  On 13 March 1860, Reynolds changed seats to City of Adelaide and on 9 May 1860 he became Premier and Treasurer of South Australia.

Reynolds resigned as premier and treasurer on 8 October 1861. He was treasurer in the second Waterhouse ministry from 17 October 1861 to 19 February 1862, and in the second Dutton ministry from March to September 1865. He held the same position in the fourth and fifth Ayers ministries from May 1867 to September 1868 and from October to November 1868. He was commissioner of crown lands in the seventh Ayers ministry from March 1872 to July 1873. Reynolds represented East Adelaide from 5 November 1864 to 27 March 1870 and Encounter Bay from 14 December 1871 to 2 February 1872 and 29 February 1872 to 28 August 1873.

Some years earlier his interest in the Northern Territory had been stimulated by reports from his nephew, Frederick Henry Litchfield.  Early in 1873 he visited Darwin where there was a gold-rush, and found matters completely disorganized. Many of the official staff had not only taken up claims but had been allowed leave of absence to look after their mines. Reynolds did his best to restore order and returned to Adelaide where he reported favourably on the mineral resources of the north. Not finding himself in agreement with his colleagues in the ministry he retired from parliament and went to Darwin. He was not successful there, and was returning to Adelaide on the SS Gothenburg which was wrecked in a tropical cyclone near the Great Barrier Reef on 24 February 1875, and he was drowned. He was married to Anne Litchfield, who lost her life in the same shipwreck. He was survived by two sons.

Long associated with the total abstinence (temperance) movement in Adelaide, Reynolds was known as "Teapot Tommy". Reynolds was a shrewd business man, a hard worker, and a good treasurer, but was of too sanguine and fiery a temperament to be a politician of the first rank. He was a pioneer in jam-making and raisin-curing in South Australia, but his devotion to his parliamentary duties led sometimes to the neglect of his own financial interests.

Sources
Gordon D. Combe, 'Reynolds, Thomas (1818–1875)', Australian Dictionary of Biography, Volume 6, Melbourne University Press, 1976, pp 23–24.

Reynolds, Thomas: Australian Dictionary of Biography
Reynolds, Thomas Australian Dictionary of Biography

References

External links
The South Australian Register and The South Australian Advertiser, 8 March 1875
Hodder, E.,  The History of South Australia

 

|-

|-

|-

|-

|-

|-

|-

|-

|-

|-

|-

Premiers of South Australia
1818 births
1875 deaths
Deaths due to shipwreck at sea
Natural disaster deaths in Australia
Deaths in tropical cyclones
Settlers of South Australia
Treasurers of South Australia
Australian jam and preserved fruit makers
19th-century Australian politicians
English emigrants to colonial Australia
19th-century Australian businesspeople
Members of the South Australian House of Assembly
Members of the South Australian Legislative Council